Izidor Gross (25 June 1860 – 1942) was a Croatian chess master and hazzan.

Background
Gross was born into a Jewish family in Kislőd, Hungary on 25 June 1860. In 1891 he settled in Karlovac, Croatia where he served as a hazzan at Karlovac Synagogue. Apart from work at the Karlovac Jewish community, Gross was an avid chess master and notable writer about chess problems and the game itself. He is one of the founders of the Karlovac chess club in 1908 and Croatian chess federation in 1912. Gross published articles about chess problems in various domestic - foreign magazines and newspapers. In 1909 he published a book Šahovska abeceda (Chess alphabet). He composed direct mates, with some incursions in helpmates. Gross organized in Karlovac, in 1912, first international chess tournament in the Balkans. As a Jew Gross was arrested and deported to Jasenovac concentration camp where he was killed in 1942 during the Holocaust, together with his son Herman and daughter in law Julia.

Works
 Rochade und Notation bei Ibn Esra, Druck von T. Schatzky, Breslau (1900)
 Povijest šaha, Knjigotiskara M. Fogina, Karlovac (1912)
 Problemi Karlovačkog medunarodnog šahovskog turnira, Knjigotiskara Dragutina Hauptfelda, Karlovac (1913)
 Šahovska abeceda, Knjižara St. Kugli, Zagreb (1923)
 150 izabranih problema, Knjigotiskara M. Fogina, Karlovac (1936)
 Humorističke crtice iz jevrejskog života, Knjigotiskara M. Fogina, Karlovac (1938)

References

Bibliography

 

1860 births
1942 deaths
People from Veszprém County
Jewish chess players
Hungarian Jews
Austro-Hungarian Jews
Croatian Austro-Hungarians
Croatian people of Hungarian-Jewish descent
Sportspeople from Karlovac
Hazzans
Croatian chess players
Croatian civilians killed in World War II
People who died in Jasenovac concentration camp
Hungarian people executed in Nazi concentration camps
Croatian people executed in Nazi concentration camps
Croatian Jews who died in the Holocaust